"Money" is a song written by Lasse Anderson and performed by Elin Lanto at Melodifestivalen 2007. The song participated in the semifinal in Jönköping before reaching Andra chansen, where it was knocked out of the contest. The single peaked at 16th position at the Swedish singles chart. On 1 April 2007, the song was tested for Svensktoppen., but failed.

Charts

References

External links
Information at Svensk mediedatabas

2007 singles
2007 songs
Elin Lanto songs
Songs written by Lasse Anderson
Melodifestivalen songs of 2007
English-language Swedish songs